Mărişelu Hydro Power Plant is a large power plant on the Someşul Cald river situated in Romania.

The power plant generates 560 GWh of electricity per year.

See also

Porţile de Fier I
Porţile de Fier II

External links
Description 

Hydroelectric power stations in Romania
Dams in Romania